Ye Qiaobo (born June 3, 1964) is a Chinese speed skater. She was born in Changchun, Jilin. She competed in the 1992 Winter Olympics and in the 1994 Winter Olympics.

In 1992, she won the silver medal in the 500 metres event as well as in the 1000 metres competition. Her silver in the 500m is the first ever medal for a Chinese athlete at the Winter Olympics. Two years later she won the bronze medal in the 1000 metres contest and finished 13th in the 500 metres event. She was the winner for World Sprint Speed Skating Championships for Women in 1992 and 1993.

External links

Biography of Ye Qiaobo 

1964 births
Living people
Chinese female speed skaters
Olympic speed skaters of China
Olympic silver medalists for China
Olympic bronze medalists for China
Olympic medalists in speed skating
Speed skaters at the 1992 Winter Olympics
Speed skaters at the 1994 Winter Olympics
Medalists at the 1992 Winter Olympics
Medalists at the 1994 Winter Olympics
Asian Games medalists in speed skating
Speed skaters at the 1986 Asian Winter Games
Speed skaters at the 1990 Asian Winter Games
Speed skaters from Changchun
Medalists at the 1986 Asian Winter Games
Medalists at the 1990 Asian Winter Games
Asian Games silver medalists for China
Asian Games bronze medalists for China
20th-century Chinese women
21st-century Chinese women